Qianjiang Century City is a metro station on Line 2 and Line 6 in China. It is located in the Xiaoshan District of Hangzhou. The Line 2 part of the station was opened on 28 April 2016. The Line 6 part of the station was opened on 30 December 2020.

References

Railway stations in Zhejiang
Hangzhou Metro stations
Railway stations in China opened in 2016